This is a list of recordings of the Romanian soprano opera singer Angela Gheorghiu (born 7 September 1965). The list includes live and studio recordings available in audio CD, VHS and DVD.

Operas, concert works

Audio

Video

Solo recitals

Solo compilations

EP / single

Live concerts

Audio

Video

Compilations

Credits

Notes

External links
Discography at AngelaGheorghiu.com, accessed 20 April 2011
EMI artist discography, accessed 20 April 2011

Opera singer discographies